Presenting Thad Jones/Mel Lewis & The Jazz Orchestra is a 1966 big band jazz album recorded by the Thad Jones/Mel Lewis Jazz Orchestra and released on the Solid State Records label.  It is the debut release by the orchestra (although an earlier live session recording would eventually be released as Opening Night).  All tracks are also included on Mosaic's limited edition boxed set, The Complete Solid State Recordings of the Thad Jones/Mel Lewis Orchestra.

The track titled "Three in One" is incorrectly labeled on the album cover. The correct title of the piece is "Three and One." The piece was originally written by Jones for a 1958 small group session titled "Keepin' Up With The Joneses" with Thad, his two siblings (Hank on piano and Elvin on drums), and bass player Eddie Jones (no relation). The title refers to the three Jones siblings plus one other Jones who is unrelated. The correct title is on the original parts as well as the later published version by Kendor.

Track listing
LP side one
 "Once Around" – 5:24
 "Willow Weep for Me" (Ann Ronell, arr. Bob Brookmeyer) – 5:34
 "Balanced Scales = Justice" (Tom McIntosh) – 4:58
 "Three in One" – 5:45
LP side two
 "Mean What You Say" – 5:26
 "Don't Ever Leave Me" – 4:33
 "A B C Blues" (Brookmeyer)– 12:53

All songs by Thad Jones except as noted.

Personnel
 Thad Jones – flugelhorn
 Mel Lewis – drums
 Sam Herman - Guitar
 Hank Jones – piano
 Richard Davis – bass
 Jerome Richardson – saxophone
 Jerry Dodgion – saxophone
 Joe Farrell – saxophone
 Eddie Daniels – saxophone
 Pepper Adams – saxophone
 Richard Williams – trumpet
 Danny Stiles – trumpet
 Bill Berry – trumpet
 Jimmy Nottingham – trumpet
 Bob Brookmeyer – trombone
 Jack Rains – trombone
 Tom McIntosh – trombone
 Cliff Heather – trombone

References & external links
 [ Allmusic]
Solid State SS 18003
United Artists (UK) SULP 1169

The Thad Jones/Mel Lewis Orchestra albums
1966 albums
Solid State Records (jazz label) albums